Private Orren Bennett was an American soldier who fought in the American Civil War. Bennett received the country's highest award for bravery during combat, the Medal of Honor, for his action during the Battle of Sayler's Creek in Virginia on 6 April 1865. He was honored with the award on 10 May 1865.

Biography
Bennett was born in Bradford County, Pennsylvania. He enlisted into the 141st Pennsylvania Infantry at Towanda, Pennsylvania. His date of death is unknown.

Medal of Honor citation

See also

List of American Civil War Medal of Honor recipients: A–F

References

People of Pennsylvania in the American Civil War
Union Army soldiers
United States Army Medal of Honor recipients
American Civil War recipients of the Medal of Honor